Huntsville High School is an American public high school in Huntsville, Madison County, Alabama in the Huntsville metropolitan area. It is part of the Huntsville City Schools district with approximately 1,850 students currently enrolled in grades 9–12.

The school is located at the intersection of Bob Wallace Avenue (formerly 13th Street West) and Billie Watkins Street.

In 2014, the school constructed its Freshman Academy on-site, intended to facilitate students' transition from middle school to high school and in which the majority of its freshman classes take place. The school offers 15 Advanced Placement courses alongside preparatory courses for industry certification.

The school's current principal is Aaron King and its current assistant principals are Kari Flippo, Mark Fleetwood, Cory Muhammad, and Lauren Woltjen.

Athletics
Huntsville High School competes at the 7A classification of the AHSAA and uses the Panther nickname for all team sports. Huntsville High sponsors varsity-level athletics in the following sports:

Huntsville High currently supplies one team to the Huntsville Amateur Hockey Association's high school league.  The Huntsville Panthers have won AHSAA state championship events in baseball, boys' cross country, girls' cross country, girls' volleyball, girls' soccer, girls' indoor track and field, girls' outdoor track and field, boys' swimming and diving, girls' swimming and diving, boys' tennis, and girls' tennis, in addition to gymnastics state championships in the 1980s (discontinued by the AHSAA in 1998), as well as several cheerleading state championships in the late 1990s before the AHSAA sponsored the sport.

As of November 1, 2012, the Huntsville High Lady Panther volleyball team had won the AHSAA state title 10 times out of 11 years, losing only one year in the semifinals to Pelham High School. The Huntsville High girls' cross country team placed second in the state meet in 2014 and won the 7A state championship in 2016.

Notable alumni
Jerry Balisok, professional wrestler and FBI fugitive
Jed Bradley, baseball player
Robert "Bud" Cramer, Member of the House of Representatives
Jan Davis, former NASA astronaut
Brewer Hicklen, baseball player in the Kansas City Royals organization
Margaret Hoelzer, Olympic swimmer
Bobby Luna, former NFL football player
Dee Margo, mayor of El Paso, Texas
Paul McDonald, American Idol finalist in Season 10 and member of The Grand Magnolias
Nicholas Morrow, NFL football player
Benny Nelson, former AFL football player for the Houston Oilers
David F. O'Neill, Naval Aviator and Major general, U.S. Marine Corps
Loretta Spencer, 66th Mayor of Huntsville

See also
List of high schools in Alabama

References

External links
Huntsville High School Web Page

High schools in Huntsville, Alabama
School buildings completed in 2004
Schools in Madison County, Alabama
Public high schools in Alabama
2004 establishments in Alabama